Inquisitor radula is a species of sea snail, a marine gastropod mollusk in the family Pseudomelatomidae.

Description
It is closely related to Vexitomina metcalfei (Angas, 1867), but is shorter, stouter, more solid, and more harshly sculptured.

Distribution
This marine species is endemic to Australia and occurs off Queensland.and Japan.

References

 Hinds, R.B. 1843. Description of new shells from the collection of Captain Belcher. Annals and Magazine of Natural History ser. 1 11: 16–21, 36–46, 255–257
 Angas, G.F. 1867. A list of species of marine Mollusca found in Port Jackson harbour, New South Wales, and on the adjacent coasts, with notes on their habits, etc. Part I. Proceedings of the Zoological Society of London 1867: 185–233 
 Smith, E.A. 1875. A list of the Gasteropoda (sic) collected in Japanese seas by Commander H.C. St. John, R.N. Annals and Magazine of Natural History 4 15: 414–427
 Brazier, J. 1876. A list of the Pleurotomidae collected during the Chevert Expedition, with the description of the new species. Proceedings of the Linnean Society of New South Wales 1: 151–162 
 Weinkauff, H.C. 1876. Das Genus Pleurotoma. pp. 49–136 in Küster, H.C., Martini, F.W. & Chemnitz, J.H. (eds). Systematisches Conchylien-Cabinet von Martini und Chemnitz. Nürnberg : Bauer & Raspe Vol. 4.

External links
 Schepman, 1913. The prosobranchia of the Siboga expedition. Part IV -V – VI: Toxoglossa 
  Tucker, J.K. 2004 Catalog of recent and fossil turrids (Mollusca: Gastropoda). Zootaxa 682:1–1295

radula
Gastropods of Australia
Gastropods described in 1843